Aghbolagh (also Romanized as Āghbolāgh and Āgh Bolāgh; also known as Ak-Bulagi, Āqbolāgh, Āq Bolāgh, Āqbolāgh-e Gīvī, Āq Bolaghī, and Āqbulāqi) is a village in Khanandabil-e Gharbi Rural District, in the Central District of Khalkhal County, Ardabil Province, Iran. At the 2006 census, its population was 88, in 20 families.

References 

Towns and villages in Khalkhal County